Faazil Kassam (born 5 August 1985) is a Canadian table tennis player. He competed in the men's doubles event at the 2004 Summer Olympics.

References

1985 births
Living people
Canadian male table tennis players
Olympic table tennis players of Canada
Table tennis players at the 2004 Summer Olympics
People from Richmond, British Columbia
Sportspeople from British Columbia